The Sailor is the second studio album by Indonesian rapper Rich Brian. It was released on 26 July 2019, through 88rising and 12Tone Music and it served as the follow-up to his debut studio album Amen. The album was primarily produced by Bēkon and The Donuts, alongside Rich Brian with production contributions by Teddy Sinclair, among others and features guest appearances from RZA and Joji.

Background 
On 18 June 2019, Rich Brian announced the lead single from the album "Yellow" through his social media accounts. The song and its accompanying music video was released on 26 June 2019, with the video revealing a new album from Brian was to be expected on 26 July 2019. Days prior to the release of the album, Brian released snippets for the tracks "The Sailor" and "Rapapapa".

In an interview with Complex about the album and how it was different from his last project, Amen, Brian said:

The biggest change is the writing has improved a lot. I realized on this album that I can literally title it anything. When I was making it, I was still kind of learning about writing and still trying to find my style. And I wasn't really sure, like, 'OK, what can I write about?' I truly thought you can run out of things to talk about, but you actually cannot. You can literally talk about anything. It's just a matter of how things are worded. On this album, I am writing about things that are really, really personal to me. I am just trying to be as vulnerable as possible. Production-wise, too, I'm collaborating a lot more versus me doing it all by myself. On this album, I'm learning to let things go a little bit, while not sacrificing my creative freedom.

Promotion 
The album's lead single, "Yellow" was released on 26 June 2019, along with an accompanied music video and features vocals from singer and producer Bēkon. The music video was directed by Dave Meyers.

The album's second single, "Kids" was released on 17 July 2019, with a music video being released 2 days later. The music video was directed by Sing J. Lee.

Following the release of the album, Brian released a short film titled, Rich Brian is The Sailor, on 30 July 2019, which was written and directed by Sing J. Lee.

He also teamed up with Spotify and his label 88rising to present an exhibition for his new album called "The Sailor Experience" and was held in his hometown Jakarta, Indonesia, 8–10 August 2019.

Track listing
Credits adapted from Tidal.

Charts

References

2019 albums
Rich Brian albums
88rising albums
Albums produced by Frank Dukes